Sergei Dmitrievich Vasilyev (4 November 1900, Moscow – 16 December 1959, Moscow) was a Soviet and Russian film director, screenwriter and actor. From 1928 to 1943 together with Georgi Vasilyev (often jointly, though incorrectly credited as the Vasilyev brothers) he co-directed several films, including the influential and critically acclaimed Chapaev (1934). Sergei Vasilyev was granted the honorary title of People's Artist of the USSR in 1948; and received (with Georgi Vasilyev) two Stalin Prizes in 1941 and 1942.

His 1942 film The Defence of Tsaritsyn concerns the Battle of Tsaritsyn during the Russian Civil War, a battle in which Joseph Stalin played a prominent role. In 1942, Tsaritsyn, by then renamed Stalingrad, was in the midst of the decisive Battle of Stalingrad, a turning point of the Second World War.

Filmography

Honours and awards
 People's Artist of the USSR (1948)
 Stalin Prizes;
first class (1941) – for the film Chapaev (1934)
first class (1942) – for the 1st series of the film The Defence of Tsaritsyn (1941)
 Two Orders of Lenin (1935, 1950)
 Order of the Red Banner of Labour (1954)
 Order of the Red Star (1944)
 Medal "For Valiant Labour in the Great Patriotic War 1941–1945" (1945)
 Best Director at Cannes (1955) – for the film Heroes of Shipka (the film was nominated for the Palme d'Or)

External links

1900 births
1959 deaths
Mass media people from Moscow
People from Moskovsky Uyezd
Russian male film actors
20th-century Russian screenwriters
Male screenwriters
20th-century Russian male writers
Soviet film directors
Soviet male film actors
Soviet screenwriters
People's Artists of the USSR
Stalin Prize winners
Recipients of the Order of Lenin
Recipients of the Order of the Red Banner of Labour
Recipients of the Order of the Red Star
Cannes Film Festival Award for Best Director winners
Burials at Novodevichy Cemetery